Michelle Fountain is a British entomologist and ecologist, she is Head of Pest and Pathogen Ecology at the National Institute of Agricultural Botany's East Malling Research Station.

Education and career 
Fountain studied her doctorate at the University of Reading, her focus was on springtails (Collembola) in urban soils.

Research 
Fountain's research looks at biological control techniques to reduce pest insects on fruit and vegetables, such as using pheromones to manipulate male or females to reduce the reproduction rate of a pest.  She led some of the first work to quantify the role of [hoverflies] in [pollinating] [strawberry] crops, she showed that hoverflies can reduce pests by predating on aphids as larvae and then pollinating fruit flowers as adults.

Fountain has researched control methods for the pest insect spotted wing drosophila in the UK.  She researched how earwigs could be beneficial in orchards, as they can eat pest of fruit trees such as wooly aphid and codling moth. Fountain pioneered a technique where predatory mites on mature tree branches are introduced to orchards of young trees, to help control insect pests.

She appeared on BBC Radio 4 Today Programme in 2014 talking about the unusual abundance of fruit flies and explained this was likely due to a mild winter.

In 2019 she edited a book 'Integrated management of diseases and insect pests of tree fruit' with Professor Xiangming Xu, published by Burleigh Dodds Science Publishing.

Her publication list can be found at

References

External links
 

Living people
21st-century British biologists
British entomologists
British ecologists
Women entomologists
Women ecologists
Alumni of the University of Reading
Date of birth missing (living people)
Year of birth missing (living people)